There are two large sulfate spikes caused by mystery volcanic eruptions in the mid-1400s: the 1452/1453 mystery eruption and 1458 mystery eruption. Before 2012, the date of 1458 sulfate spike was incorrectly assigned to be 1452 because previous ice core work had poor time resolution. The exact location of this eruption is uncertain, but possible candidates include the submerged caldera of Kuwae in the Coral Sea, Mount Reclus and Tofua caldera. The eruption is believed to have been VEI-7.

Date of sulfate spike 
This sulfate spike was first discovered in Antarctica ice cores and is one of largest sulfur events along with that of Samalas and Tambora. Initial efforts to constrain the date of the event concluded that 1452/53 is the year of eruption with uncertainty up to a few years. Since 2012, highly accurate ice core chronology re-dated this massive sulfur spike to 1458 and has matched with its corresponding Greenland sulfur spike though the latter is significantly smaller.

Ice-core and tree-ring records 
The sulfate deposition of this event is the largest recorded in ice cores in the last 700 years. The deposition however is asymmetric with much large sulfate flux in the Antartica ice cores compared to that of Greenland ice cores, indicating that the eruption probably occurred in the low latitudes of the Southern Hemisphere. Sulfur isotope composition of the 1458 sulfate indicates that the eruption emitted volcanic gases directly into the stratosphere, with significant impact on atmospheric chemistry and potential consequence for global climate. The reconstructed volcanic stratospheric sulfur injection of the 1458 event estimates that about 37.5 trillion grams of sulfur was injected into stratosphere, roughly equivalent that of Tambora but 3 more times massive than the earlier 1452/53 eruption based on the same set of sulfate records. In South Pole ice core, tephra was discovered in the sulfate layer, allowing geochemical matching to identify the source volcano of the sulfate spike if the tephra source was responsible for the sulfate spike.

In the year following eruption, tree-ring Northern Hemisphere in 1459 summer registered a strong cooling of −1.0 °C and again −0.4 °C in 1460.

Source of eruption 
While the source volcano of the sulfur spike has not been definitely identified, several candidate volcanos have been proposed. The sulfate flux distribution in the ice cores suggests that the location of the source volcano is in the low latitudes of the Southern Hemisphere.

Kuwae Caldera 

Kuwae caldera is a caldera responsible for the catastrophic, mid-fifteen century, volcanic eruption and disappearance of Kuwae landmass in the Tongoan folklore. Its exact location, however, is debated.  Two candidates are:

 a 6 x 12 km submarine caldera between the Epi and Tongoa islands
 South of Tongoa, exposed part of the western rim is marked by the islands of Tongoa, Ewose, Buninga and Tongariki

Regardless of the precise location, radiocarbon datings of thick pyroclastic flows on Tongoa cluster around 1410–1450 AD. Geochemical analysis of the magma determined its sulfur-rich nature and is capable of producing the greatest amount of sulfate in the last 700 years, if caldera volume equivalent amount of magma erupted. 

Németh et. al. (2007), however, questioned the proposed large magnitude and intensity of the eruption, noting that pyroclastic flows are small-volume and lacking widespread fall deposits. Further evidence is needed to establish the relation between formation of large submarine caldera and the apparently small mid-fifteen century eruption preserved on land. Furthermore, geochemistry of Kuwae magma does not match with that of the tephra discovered in 1458 sulfate layer.

A new investigation led by volcanologists and anthropologists is ongoing in order to resolve the debate around the nature of Kuwae eruption and its climate consequence.

Tofua Caldera 
Németh et. al. (2007), on the basis of a similar radiocarbon age, proposed Tofua caldera as another candidate volcano for the 1458 sulfate spike. Unpublished radiocarbon data shows that there was a large Tofua eruption, which deposited >10 cm of tephra over inhabited islands in Central Tonga around 1440–1640 AD.

Mount Reclus 
The source of tephra occurred with 1458 sulfate layer in the Antarctica ice core has not been definitely identified. Based on geochemical correlation, the tephra is compositionally similar to the magma of Reclus volcano. However, there is no known large eruption from Reclus volcano during this period. Hence, it is hypothesized that an eruption of small magnitude but geographically close to the ice core might have created the sulfate spike through a tropospherically transported aerosol cloud. This, however, is inconsistent with the sulfur isotope evidence and widespread deposition of volcanic sulfate.

Historical records 
Historical records, largely from Europe and Eastern Asia, report multiple years in the 1450s to 1460s with anomalous weather patterns. Smog and haze were seen in the sky and multiple records describe the sun as being blue in color and volcanic ash raining from the sky. There were severe increases in precipitation and decreases in temperature. These weather and climate changes would be the result of a large aerosol cloud produced by a volcanic eruption spreading across the earth; however, medieval records of atmospheric phenomena are not always accurate.

Climate implications 
The weather patterns caused by this eruption had an impact on the life of people globally. Freezing temperatures and excessive rainfall led to famine and low quality crops. The number of people who starved to death increased over these years, and the decreased quality of wine during the time period was noted in historical records. Freezing temperatures and flooding also led to death and property damage. These factors put pressure on medieval governments and negatively impacted military efforts.

See also
 1808 mystery eruption
 1815 eruption of Mount Tambora
 Ice core
 Kuwae, the volcano hypothesized to be responsible for the 1458 sulfate spike.
 Timeline of volcanism on Earth
 Volcanic explosivity index
 Year Without a Summer, caused by Mount Tambora's eruption in 1815.

References

15th-century volcanic events
1458
VEI-7 eruptions
Plinian eruptions
Unexplained phenomena